The Nepal women's U-17 national football team, otherwise known as Nepali Cheli's (Nepalese Sisters) is controlled by the All Nepal Football Association and represents Nepal in women's international football competitions. The Women's Football Department is developed to control and manage the women's football activities. The official motto of women's football in Nepal is "Football for Change". It is a member of the Asian Football Confederation and the South Asian Football Federation and has yet to qualify for the Asian Cup.

The team played their debut game against Bangladesh on 17 December, 2017 in 2017 SAFF U-15 Women's Championship which they lost by 6–0 margin. They finished last in the group stage, losing to India by 10–0 margin and then gained their first ever points in the tournament by drawing 1–1 against Bhutan.

In the next edition of the tournament, Nepal qualified for the semi-finals for the first time but went down to India by narrow margin of 2–1 following which Nepal played third-place game against Bhutan which they lost in penalty shootout. During the same tournament, head coach Sanoj Shreshtha made it clear that Nepali players were not overaged.

Squad
Squad called up for 2019 SAFF U-15 Women's Championship.

References 

Asian women's national under-17 association football teams
u17